Meet the Care Bears is a 2004 children's album from Madacy Kids, the first to be recorded for the early 2000s revival of the Care Bears toy line.

Track listing
 We Live in Care-a-lot 	
 The Fun Starts Here 	
 Pat-a-cake, Pat-a-cake
 Have I Got a Friend for You
 Rain, Rain Go Away
 With a Smile, Smile, Smile
 Do Your Share of Sharing
 Twinkle, Twinkle Little Star
 If You're Happy and You Know It
 A Very Goodnight to You
 Your Wish is My Wish, Too
 With a Great Big Care Bear Hug

References

2004 albums
Care Bears
Children's music albums